Live-Evil is an album of both live and studio recordings by American jazz musician Miles Davis. Parts of the album featured music from Davis' concert at the Cellar Door in 1970, which producer Teo Macero subsequently edited and pieced together in the studio. They were performed as lengthy, dense jams in the jazz-rock style, while the studio recordings consisted mostly of renditions of Hermeto Pascoal compositions. The album was originally released on November 17, 1971.

Background 
A number of famous jazz musicians feature on the album, including Keith Jarrett and Jack DeJohnette. One of the key musicians on the album, John McLaughlin, was not a regular member of Miles Davis's band during the time of recording. Davis called McLaughlin at the last minute to join the band for the last of four nights they recorded live at the Cellar Door, as Davis was "looking for an element he hadn't quite nailed down" on the previous nights.

Davis had originally intended the album to be a spiritual successor to Bitches Brew, but this idea was abandoned when it became obvious that Live-Evil was "something completely different".

Cover artwork
The album cover was illustrated by artist Mati Klarwein. Klarwein had painted the front cover independently of Davis, but the back cover was painted with a suggestion from Davis:
"I was doing the picture of the pregnant woman for the cover and the day I finished, Miles called me up and said, 'I want a picture of life on one side and evil on the other.' And all he mentioned was a toad. Then next to me was a copy of Time Magazine which had J. Edgar Hoover on the cover, and he just looked like a toad. I told Miles I found the toad."

Record club pressings of the album simply had the album title printed on a black cover.

Critical reception 

Live-Evil was released by Columbia Records in 1971 to critical acclaim. In a contemporary review for Rolling Stone, Robert Palmer said "this sounds like what Miles had in mind when he first got into electric music and freer structures and rock rhythms". He called the shorter, ballad-like recordings "things of great beauty", devoid of solos but full of "stunning, bittersweet lines", while also praising each band member's soloing on the live jams: "Everybody is just playing away, there aren't any weak links, and there isn't any congestion to speak of. Miles reacts to this happy situation by playing his ass off, too". Black World critic Red Scott remarked that all of Live-Evils songs "fuse into a perfect complement of musicians passing moods to each other". Pete Welding from Down Beat was less enthusiastic in a two-and-a-half star review, finding the live recordings characterized by "long dull stretches of water-treading alternating with moments of strength and inspiration".

The magazine's John Corbett later called Live-Evil "an outstandingly creative electric collage", while Erik Davis from Spin found the music "kinetic" and described McLaughlin's playing as "Hindu heavy-metal fretwork". Pitchforks Ryan Schreiber believed it was "easily the most accessible of Miles Davis' late-'70s [sic] electric releases", describing its music as "at once both sexually steamy and unsettling". He said the live recordings "run the gamut from barroom brawl action-funk to sensual bedroom jazz magic, creating two hours of charged eccentricity you'll never forget". Robert Christgau said that apart from the meandering "Inamorata", the "long pieces are usually fascinating and often exciting", including "Funky Tonk", which he called Davis's "most compelling rhythmic exploration to date". He believed the shorter pieces sounded like "impressionistic experiments", while "Selim" and "Nem Um Talvez" appropriately "hark back to the late '50s". Edwin C. Faust from Stylus Magazine called Live-Evil "one of the funkiest albums ever recorded" while deeming the "somber" short pieces to be "haunting examples of musical purity—Miles enriching our ears with evocative melodies (his work on Sketches of Spain comes to mind) while the bass creeps cautiously, an organ hums tensly, and human whistles/vocals float about forebodingly like wistful phantoms".

Track listing

Personnel and recording sources
The live tracks on Live-Evil were truncated edits of various live jams recorded at The Cellar Door in 1970. Below is a list of each track with its corresponding source performances (which were released in the 2005 box set The Cellar Door Sessions 1970).

Side one (25:50)
1. "Sivad" (15:13)(Recorded December 19, 1970 at The Cellar Door, Washington, DC & May 19, 1970 at Columbia Studio B, New York, NY)

Miles Davis - electric trumpet with wah-wah
Gary Bartz - soprano and alto saxophone
John McLaughlin - electric guitar
Keith Jarrett - electric piano, organ
Michael Henderson - electric bass
Jack DeJohnette - drums
Airto Moreira - percussion

2. "Little Church" (3:14)(Recorded June 4, 1970 at Columbia Studio B, New York, NY)
 Miles Davis - trumpet
 Steve Grossman - soprano saxophone
 Herbie Hancock, Chick Corea - electric piano
 Keith Jarrett - organ
 John McLaughlin - electric guitar
 Dave Holland - electric bass, acoustic bass
 Jack DeJohnette - drums
 Airto Moreira - percussion
 Hermeto Pascoal - drums, whistling, voice, electric piano

3. "Medley: Gemini/Double Image" (5:53)(Recorded February 6, 1970 at Columbia Studio B, New York, NY)

Miles Davis - trumpet
Wayne Shorter - soprano saxophone
Joe Zawinul, Chick Corea - electric piano
John McLaughlin - electric guitar
Dave Holland - acoustic bass
Khalil Balakrishna - electric sitar
Billy Cobham - drums
Jack DeJohnette - drums
Airto Moreira - percussion

Side two (25:12)
1. "What I Say" (21:09)(Recorded December 19, 1970 at The Cellar Door, Washington, DC)

Miles Davis - electric trumpet with wah-wah
Gary Bartz - soprano and alto saxophone
John McLaughlin - electric guitar
Keith Jarrett - electric piano, organ
Michael Henderson - electric bass
Jack DeJohnette - drums
Airto Moreira - percussion

2. "Nem Um Talvez" (4:03)(Recorded June 3, 1970 at Columbia Studio B, New York, NY)
Miles Davis - trumpet
Steve Grossman - soprano saxophone
Herbie Hancock, Chick Corea - electric piano
Keith Jarrett - organ
Ron Carter - acoustic bass
Jack DeJohnette - drums
Airto Moreira - percussion
Hermeto Pascoal - drums, vocals

Side three (25:38)
1. "Selim" (2:12)(Recorded June 3, 1970 at Columbia Studio B, New York, NY)
Miles Davis - trumpet
Steve Grossman - soprano saxophone
Herbie Hancock, Chick Corea - electric piano
Keith Jarrett - organ
Ron Carter - acoustic bass
Jack DeJohnette - drums
Airto Moreira - percussion
Hermeto Pascoal - drums, vocals

2. "Funky Tonk" (23:26)(Recorded December 19, 1970 at The Cellar Door, Washington, DC)

Miles Davis - electric trumpet with wah-wah
Gary Bartz - soprano and alto saxophone
John McLaughlin - electric guitar
Keith Jarrett - electric piano, organ
Michael Henderson - electric bass
Jack DeJohnette - drums
Airto Moreira - percussion

Side four (26:29)
1. "Inamorata and Narration by Conrad Roberts" (26:29)(Recorded December 19, 1970 at The Cellar Door, Washington, DC)

Miles Davis - electric trumpet with wah-wah
Gary Bartz - soprano and alto saxophone
John McLaughlin - electric guitar
Keith Jarrett - electric piano, organ
Michael Henderson - electric bass
Jack DeJohnette - drums
Airto Moreira - percussion
Conrad Roberts - vocal narration, poem

Note: The Cellar Door Sessions 1970 box set uses the titles "Improvisation #4" (for Keith Jarrett's keyboard intro) and "Inamorata" instead of "Funky Tonk".  In the Source column of the tables above, the title "Funky Tonk" is used.

See also 
 The Cellar Door Sessions 1970

References

Bibliography

External links 
 

1971 albums
Columbia Records albums
Miles Davis albums
Jazz fusion albums by American artists
Jazz-funk albums
Albums produced by Teo Macero
1971 live albums
Live jazz fusion albums
Live jazz-funk albums
Columbia Records live albums
Legacy Recordings albums
Legacy Recordings live albums
Albums with cover art by Mati Klarwein